The Borgias is a historical-fiction drama television series created by Neil Jordan; it debuted in 2011 and was canceled in 2013.

The series is set in Renaissance-era Italy and follows the Borgia family in their scandalous ascension to the papacy. Mercilessly cruel and defiantly decadent, the Borgias use bribery, simony, intimidation and murder in their relentless quest for wealth and power that make them history's most infamous crime family. It stars Jeremy Irons as Pope Alexander VI with François Arnaud as Cesare, Holliday Grainger as Lucrezia and David Oakes as Juan. Colm Feore also stars as Cardinal della Rovere (later Pope Julius II).

It premiered on April 3, 2011, at 9 p.m. ET on Showtime in the United States and 10 p.m. Eastern (UTC−04:00) on Bravo! in Canada, and received its first major television network premiere on June 21, 2011, on Canada's CTV Television Network. The second season premiered on April 8, 2012. On May 4, 2012, Showtime ordered a third season of 10 episodes, which premiered on April 14, 2013.

On June 5, 2013, Showtime canceled the series, a season short of Jordan's planned four-season arc for the series. The cancellation was implied to be due to the expense of production, with plans for a two-hour wrap-up finale also scrapped. A fan campaign was started in an attempt to convince Showtime to revive the series. On August 12, 2013, it was announced that the two-hour series finale script would be released as an e-book, after it was determined that a movie would be too expensive to produce.

Plot overview
The series follows the rise of the Borgia family to the pinnacle of the Catholic Church and their struggles to maintain their grip on power. The beginning of the first season depicts the election of Rodrigo Borgia to the papacy through simony and bribery, with the help of his sons, Cesare and Juan. Upon winning the election, Rodrigo Borgia becomes Pope Alexander VI, which then thrusts him and his family deep into the murky heart of politics in fifteenth-century Europe: from shifting loyalties within the College of Cardinals to the ambitions of the kings of Europe to the venomous rivalries between the noble families of Italy at the time.

Meanwhile, enraged by his loss of the election to Borgia, Cardinal Giuliano della Rovere travels across Italy and France, seeking allies to depose or kill Alexander: this would force another papal conclave and race for Pope which della Rovere is convinced he would win without Borgia to oppose him.

The series also follows the complicated sibling relationships between Cesare, Juan, and Lucrezia. Between Cesare and Juan, there is deep rivalry, with jealousy and resentment on Cesare's side; inferiority and aggression on Juan's. Juan's descent into addiction, illness, malice, and madness in the second season leads to a shocking confrontation between him and Cesare which forever changes the family. Between Cesare and Lucrezia, there is an abiding intimacy and closeness which finally delves into incest in Season 3, as the show's take on the persistent rumors about the real-life siblings. Their youngest sibling, Gioffre, is a minor player in the first season, not seen at all in the second, and does not become a major plot point until the third and final season.

The show also addressed Lucrezia's first and second marriage, her illegitimate child, the affair between Alexander VI and Giulia "La Bella" Farnese, the rise of Girolamo Savonarola in Florence, his Bonfire of the Vanities and eventual burning for heresy.

The series cancellation prevented the death of Pope Alexander VI and the succession of Pope Julius II from being explored, and the downfall of Cesare Borgia.

Cast

Main cast
 Jeremy Irons as Rodrigo Borgia / Pope Alexander VI: An ambitious clergyman and patriarch of the Borgia family, he uses his position to acquire wealth, power and influence, becoming pope in 1492. Shrewd and scheming, he is utterly devoted to his family but enjoys the company of beautiful women, as well. The Pope, despite his corruption and cunning, believes he is doing what is right but often questions himself and his actions when innocents are caught in the crossfire. His favourite children are clearly shown to be Juan and Lucrezia, and he has a special fondness for their mother, Vanozza.
 François Arnaud as Cesare Borgia: Oldest son of Rodrigo, he is his father's consigliere in the church. However, he desires to leave the priesthood, preferring warfare to the clergy. Self-confident, impatient, and possessing a sharp wit, Cesare quickly earns a notorious reputation. He has a violent streak, mercilessly killing anyone to help the family's cause or eliminate romantic rivals. His love and devotion to his sister Lucrezia is his one soft spot. He hardens after the torture and death of his lover, Ursula Bonadeo, and the brutal treatment of his sister by her first husband, and brings terrible vengeance to the perpetrators of both crimes. Once disinterested in the papacy, he develops a taste for power which leads him to become a brilliant warrior and shrewd leader feared by all of Europe.
 Holliday Grainger as Lucrezia Borgia: Daughter of Rodrigo, she is the apple of her father's eye. Brilliant, witty, and exceedingly beautiful, Lucrezia proves to be her father's main asset time and again, single-handedly saving the Borgia papacy on several occasions. There also seems to be an abnormal relationship between Lucrezia and her father in season 1. From its onset, the series implies an emotionally incestuous relationship between her brother Cesare and her. Her first love is Prince Djem, and when he is murdered, she is truly heartbroken. Early in the series, she is betrothed at a young age to the abusive Giovanni Sforza, and suffers from an unhappy marriage. While married to Sforza, she has a passionate affair with Paolo, a servant, and has a child by him, but he, too, is murdered. When Lucrezia and Giulia are captured by the French king, she charms him with her wit and beauty to save Rome. She rejects her father's attempts to get her to remarry, before eventually accepting Alfonso of Aragon as her new husband. Their marriage is a failure, and drives her into Cesare's forbidden arms. 
 Joanne Whalley as Vanozza Cattaneo: Courtesan and mother of the pope's children, her position as the matriarch of the family is threatened by the Borgias' newly acquired powers and the pope's new mistress, but eventually she and Giulia form a sort of friendship, and she remains in the Pope's heart. She resides in a villa and then in a dead Cardinal's Palace.
 Lotte Verbeek as Giulia Farnese: Mistress to the pope and an independent and wise woman herself, she earns the trust of Pope Alexander and becomes a close friend and mentor to Lucrezia.
 David Oakes as Juan Borgia: Second son of Rodrigo and Gonfalonier of the Papal Armies, he behaves recklessly and arrogantly, but is an inept coward. He has a cruel, violent streak but lacks the Borgia cunning possessed by his father and siblings. In the aftermath of slaying Lucrezia's beloved Paolo, he comes to fear his sister's cunning wrath (she encourages his fear, constantly toying with him and making him paranoid to avenge Paolo). After learning of abysmal behavior during his failed siege of Forli (which Juan had covered up), as well as seeing his cruelty to Lucrezia concerning her child, Cesare and Micheletto discreetly murder him after he leaves an opium den.
 Sean Harris as Micheletto Corella: Cesare's loyal henchman, he carries out ruthless killings under the order of Cesare to keep the Borgia family in power. He secretly engages in homosexual trysts, which ultimately becomes his downfall in the final season, when Micheletto takes a lover who happens to be a spy for the Sforza family, and, after being ordered to kill him, a heartbroken Micheletto abandons Cesare.
 Aidan Alexander as Gioffre Borgia: The barely pubescent youngest son of the pope, he is married to Sancia of Naples by the pope to secure an alliance with the kingdom to consolidate his papacy.
 Colm Feore as Giuliano della Rovere: A powerful cardinal in the church, after losing the papal election to Rodrigo Borgia, he devotes himself to deposing the new pope, whom he sees as lewd and blasphemous. Della Rovere's first attempt, by aligning himself with the King of France, is ultimately unsuccessful when the Pope outmaneuvers the French and persuades them to pass through Rome peacefully. His second attempt, to get a young man to become the Pope's taster, and then poison him, almost succeeds, but thanks to Lucrezia's ingenuity, he is unsuccessful, and because he chose to be at the Pope's deathbed, he is promptly arrested by Cesare, and faces torture and painful execution. However a rebellious cardinal releases him, and della Rovere escapes Rome.
 Gina McKee as Caterina Sforza: Cousin of cardinal Ascanio Sforza, Giovanni Sforza, Ludovico Sforza. Known as the legendary "Tigress of Forli" for her military prowess, she leads the powerful Sforza clan and is a chief rival for power in Italy. Like the rest of the Sforzas, she refused to support the pope against the impending French invasion. Following their victory over the French, the Borgias unleash their wrath upon the Sforzas, and Cesare is sent to Forli. He fails to persuade her to come to Rome and bow down before the Pope. Instead, she begins a passionate tryst with Cesare. A war between Caterina and the Borgias begins after Cesare kills her cousin Giovanni, avenging Lucrezia. Juan is sent to conqueror Caterina, but her cousin Ludovico defeats him at Forli. Still, Juan captures and tortures Caterina's son Benito, who is then secretly taken to Rome and released by Cesare. Caterina attempts to forge an alliance with some of the Borgias' enemies, who are subsequently won over by Cesare. A failed attempt to assassinate the Pope via a biological plague agent is thwarted by Cesare, who in turn kills her son and cousin Ludovico. The Pope, through a Jewish trader and ally, buys the entire gunpowder supply in Italy, which he then grants to Cesare, who forms an alliance between the French and the Papal armies and successfully lays siege to Forli. Defeated, Caterina attempts to commit suicide by hanging, but the rope is shot by one of Cesare's generals and she is taken prisoner. Cesare then humiliates her by organizing a grand arrival into Rome with her on display in a jaded cage, wearing an extravagant, tiger-striped dress.

Supporting cast
 Ronan Vibert as Giovanni Sforza: The Lord of Pesaro, picked as the husband of Lucrezia by the pope in exchange for support from the Sforza clan. A cold and beastly man, he rapes Lucrezia repeatedly at the beginning of the marriage. He breaks his leg after falling off a horse thanks to a scheme by stable boy Paolo out of love for Lucrezia. The household staff all hate him and several of them side with Lucrezia and aid her in her affair with Paolo. He betrays the alliance with the Borgias by refusing to support them against the impending French invasion. He is later publicly humiliated by the Borgias, who convene the College of Cardinals to have his marriage to Lucrezia annulled on the grounds of impotence. When Sforza denies the charges, the Pope declares that he must prove it before the College and two prostitutes are brought in. Sforza, unable to bear the humiliation, declares that he is impotent and is sent from Rome in disgrace. Later, after making snide comments about Lucrezia to Cesare, who is on a visit to Forli to negotiate peace with his cousin, Caterina Sforza, Cesare attacks and kills him, igniting a war between the Borgias and Caterina. 
 Edward Akrout as Yves d'Allegre (c. 1450 - battle of Ravenna, 1512) was an outstanding French captain who became known in the early Italian Wars (1494-1512).
 Steven Berkoff as Girolamo Savonarola: An influential priest in Florence who is eventually killed for preaching against the corruption in the Church and the leadership of the Borgias. 
 Simon McBurney as Johannes Burchard: The Vatican Master of Ceremonies and a scholar with impeccable expertise on canon law. To keep his position (and life), Johannes remains deliberately ambiguous about his loyalties, at times assisting both Pope Alexander VI and his enemies in their scheming.
 Augustus Prew as Alfonso II of Naples: The eldest son of King Ferdinand I of Naples. His father was old and senile, leaving himself as the effective ruler of Naples. In the series, he is eventually tortured to death by King Charles VIII, who blamed him for the plague that swept Naples, and his body is placed in his father's gruesome "Last Supper" as Judas Iscariot. However, the historical Alfonso fled to a Sicilian monastery, dying non-violently in 1495
 Luke Pasqualino as Paolo: The young servant of Giovanni Sforza. He is outraged by his master's treatment of Lucrezia and sabotages Sforza's saddle, causing his master to suffer a serious injury. He and Lucrezia later have an affair, and he fathers a child with her. He helps her escape from the Sforza household, which cost him a violent whipping from his master. He travels to Rome to search for her, naively befriending a prostitute whom Juan Borgia employs to follow him. With the help of Cesare and Micheletto, he is reunited with Lucrezia and his child for one night. Shortly after he is murdered by Juan, who hangs him to make it look like a suicide. Lucrezia is heartbroken by his death and forces her father to give Paolo a Christian burial, while also having her revenge on Juan for Paolo's murder.
 Derek Jacobi as Cardinal Orsino Orsini (fictional character): One of the cardinals who plotted against Pope Alexander, he is poisoned to death at the instruction of Cesare Borgia.
 Ruta Gedmintas as Ursula Bonadeo/Sister Martha: A noblewoman who engaged in a passionate extramarital affair with Cesare. Upon discovering Cesare killed her husband she becomes a nun and was thereafter known as Sister Martha. She is killed when the Convent of Saint Cecilia is destroyed by Charles VIII, on his way back to France after retreating from Rome. Her death fills Cesare with vengeance, and he leads a band of mercenaries to raid and destroy the French army, ultimately destroying their entire war machine.
 Elyes Gabel as Prince Cem (Djem or Jem): A rival to the Ottoman throne, who was banished by his half-brother, the Sultan. Pope Alexander accepted the Sultan's offer to host Cem in exchange for financial reward. The handsome and good-hearted young man easily wins over the Borgias, especially Lucrezia. It is heavily implied that Cem and Lucrezia fall in love, but do not consummate their relationship. Cem was eventually killed by the Borgias, who used the much more substantial reward offered by the Sultan for Cem's death, in order to pay for Lucrezia's dowry.
 Montserrat Lombard as Maria, a maid in the Orsini Palace during Giulia Farnese's stay there who is willing to testify on her indiscretions with the Pope and pays the price for it.
 Emmanuelle Chriqui as Sancha of Aragon: The illegitimate daughter of the King of Naples. When a marriage to the Borgias was proposed, Juan refused to marry her due to her illegitimacy. She was married instead to Joffre, but Juan became struck by her beauty and began an affair with her.
 Vernon Dobtcheff as Cardinal Julius Verscucci (fictional character)
 Bosco Hogan as Cardinal Piccolomini
 David Bamber as Theo: The estranged husband of Vanozza Cattaneo who was forced aside and barred from her life by Rodrigo Borgia prior to becoming pope. He lives on a remote farm the pope bought him but visits Vannozza during Lucrezia's first wedding. Cesare is civil but Juan beats him, for which the Pope severely chastises him. He is rumored to have fathered one of the Borgia children, which Juan suspects is him. 
 Peter Sullivan as Ascanio Sforza: A powerful cardinal who becomes vice-chancellor in a deal with Rodrigo Borgia to elect Borgia as pope. Sforza becomes a trusted confidant and henchman to the Borgias carrying out many duties that maintain their power and wealth. 
 Julian Bleach as Niccolò Machiavelli: A senior official in the Republic of Florence and adviser to the Medici family, he carefully considered the offers of alliance by Cardinal della Rovere and Cesare Borgia. Della Rovere pushes for Florence to give free passage of the French army on their way to Rome. He was upset when the Medicis yield hopelessly to the demands of the King of France in the face of total destruction of Florence by the French armies. He later allies with Cesare, providing advice on the matter of Savonarola and the location of Medici gold transports for Cesare to steal.
 Ivan Kaye as Ludovico Sforza: The brutish Duke of Milan, also known as "il Moro," who seized the throne and imprisoned his own nephew in the process. Despite an alliance of the Sforzas and the pope, he allowed the French army free passage through Milan on the way to Rome.
 Michel Muller as Charles VIII: King of France and commander of one of the most feared armies in Europe, Charles is a modernizing military leader who, in contrast to his theatrical opponents, conducts warfare with ruthless efficiency. He claimed the throne of Naples, and was enticed by Cardinal della Rovere to pursue this objective in return for deposing Pope Alexander. Insecure about his height and looks, he was charmed by the clever and beautiful Lucrezia Borgia on his way to seizing Rome, and later talked into an alliance by the pope, who agreed to recognize him as King of Naples. After discovering that Naples has been devastated by plague, he has Prince Alfonso II killed, but ends up catching the plague himself.
 Darwin Shaw as Augustino, a childhood friend of Micheletto. The two briefly resume a passionate and intense romance, but Augustino's betrothal to a baker's daughter deeply hurts Micheletto.
 David Lowe as the French Ambassador to Rome.
 Sebastian de Souza as Alfonso of Aragon, Duke of Bisceglie and Prince of Salerno: He arrived in Rome as suitor to Lucrezia, who chose to marry him as a second husband.
 Thure Lindhardt as Rufio: A student of the art of death, he is Caterina Sforza's ruthless assassin. He is sent to Rome by his patron to bring about the Borgias' downfall, and he tries to enlist Cardinal Sforza's help in doing so. At the end of season 3 with the Sforzas defeated Rufio is hired by Cesare. 
 Matias Varela as King Ferdinand in Season 3. Alfonso's uncle that demands proof of his nephew's consummated marriage to Lucrezia and refuses to recognize her son at court due to his illegitimacy thus incurring the wrath of Lucrezia and Cesare. He is killed by Micheletto, who pushes him into a fanciful lake of lampreys.
 Cyron Melville as Cardinal Farnese in Season 3. He is Giulia Farnese's brother that is made a cardinal through his sister's intervention with the Pope. He manages the papal finances.
 Pilou Asbæk as Paolo Orsini in Season 3.
 Patrick O'Kane as Francesco Gonzaga.
 Ana Ularu as Charlotte d'Albret, Dame de Châlus and Duchess of Valentinois. She became Cesare's wife following a pact made with King Louis XII of France to gain military support against the Sforza family.
 Jemima West as Vittoria, a young girl who disguises herself as a boy in order to be apprenticed as an artist.
 Joseph M. Kelly as Ferrante of Naples.
 Harry Taurasi as Piero de Medici.
 Luke Allen-Gale as Fredirigo.
 Abraham Belaga as Vitelezzo Vitelli.
 Björn Hlynur Haraldsson as Gian Paolo Baglioni.
 Keith Burke as Gian Galaezzo.
 Michael Poole as Pope Innocent.
 Joseph Macnab as Prospero Colonna.

Pinturicchio is mentioned as a painter of Giulia Farnese in season 1, episode 2.

Production
The series is an international co-production, filmed in Hungary, and produced in Canada. Filming in Hungary mainly took place at the Korda Studios in Etyek, just west of Budapest.

Jordan had tried to direct a film about the Borgia reign for over a decade, and the project had many times come close to fruition, with stars such as Colin Farrell and Scarlett Johansson attached to it. In 2010, Steven Spielberg, the head of DreamWorks Pictures (now a producer of The Borgias), suggested the film be turned into a cable drama, and Jordan took the idea over to Showtime executives who, wanting to fill the void historical series The Tudors would leave after its final season, commissioned the series. Jordan has stated that the ideal would be a series of four seasons so he could span at least the period of Rodrigo Borgia's papacy (1492–1503).

For the role of Rodrigo Borgia, Jordan turned to Academy Award winner Jeremy Irons, known for playing villains and anti-heroes. The actor initially had second thoughts about his suitability to play someone historically described as an obese, dark-complexioned Spaniard, but Jordan wanted him to focus on the aspects of the character's obsession with power and life, which the actor could play to the hilt.

Episodes

The first season consists of nine episodes; the premiere encompassed two episodes, with the remaining seven episodes being first-aired each week following. The second season consisted of ten episodes, the first half of which were written by show creator Neil Jordan, whereas the latter half was written by noted English writer-director David Leland, who joined the series' staff as co-showrunner and producer and directed its last two episodes. The finale of season 2 was written by Guy Burt, who also helped storyline the season. Season 3, the show's final season, again consists of ten episodes, four of which were written by Burt, while the other six, including the final episode, were again written by Jordan.

Reception
The show's first season received generally favorable reviews in the United States, scoring 66 out of 100 based on 25 critics on Metacritic. Robert Bianco of USA Today said, "... seen from a safe distance, captured by a sterling cast led in marvelous high style by Jeremy Irons, and presented with all the brio, flair and sumptuous design TV can muster, the infamous family is almost addictively entertaining". Linda Stasi of the New York Post gave the season a 3.5/4 rating, remarking "'The Borgias' (the series) makes The Tudors look like a bunch of amateurs with bigger lips."

However, it was met with a more mixed reception in the United Kingdom. Rachel Ray of The Daily Telegraph called Irons' performance "disappointingly undiabolical". She added that the show is "for history buffs, not for viewers looking for another Godfather". Sarah Dempster of The Guardian mocked the show's dialogue and visual style: "The ridiculousness mounts. The opening double bill features impromptu palazzo brawls between priapic gadabouts in bejewelled codpieces ("Back to Spain, Borgia!") and flocks of miffed cardinals gliding along darkened corridors like motorised pepperpots". Sam Wollaston recalled the 1981 BBC miniseries of the same name, which had been widely panned, and said there was "more thought to this [2011] version, and attention to character. And Irons is proper". The Independents Holly Williams praised Irons, but said elsewhere, "the acting and script feel about as substantial as a communion wafer. With power struggles, sex, assassinations and sibling rivalries, it should, at least, be racy and fun. Yet the storyline often feels curiously ungripping".

The second season's premiere was met with much more positive reviews, and holds a Metacritic score of 81/100, based on six reviews. Curt Wagner of RedEye has stated, "Based on the first four episodes of the new season, I'd say Jordan has figured things out. The Borgias still overflows with delicious intrigues, sex and deadly politics, but it now has an energy and constant forward momentum the first season lacked." Tim Goodman of The Hollywood Reporter has stated, "Borgias retains the intrigue and conniving family politics that made season one such a pleasure ride, but it all has more snap now, with Jordan spinning the plates with aplomb."

Awards and nominations
The Borgias garnered 16 different Emmy nominations throughout its run, and won three: twice for Outstanding Costumes for a Series (2011 & 2013) and once for Outstanding Original Main Title Theme Music (2011). The excellence of the costume design on the series was further recognized by the Costume Designers Guild, which twice nominated The Borgias for the Excellence in Period Television award (2011 & 2013).

Jeremy Irons was nominated for the Golden Globe Award for Best Actor – Television Series Drama in 2012.

References

External links
 
 borgias.bravo.ca , official website at Bravo!
 sho.com/borgias, official website at Showtime
 Behind the scenes pictures of the first and second seasons at Crews for News  ,  
 Behind the scenes pictures of the third season at Stillsandfilms.com

2010s Canadian drama television series
2010s Canadian LGBT-related drama television series
2011 Canadian television series debuts
2011 Irish television series debuts
2011 Hungarian television series debuts
2013 Canadian television series endings
2013 Hungarian television series endings
2013 Irish television series endings
2013 disestablishments in Ireland 
21st-century disestablishments in Hungary 
Costume drama television series
CTV Television Network original programming
CTV Drama Channel original programming
English-language television shows
Gemini and Canadian Screen Award for Best Drama Series winners
House of Borgia
Incest in television
Cultural depictions of Cesare Borgia
Cultural depictions of Lucrezia Borgia
Cultural depictions of Pope Alexander VI
Cultural depictions of Niccolò Machiavelli
Cultural depictions of Girolamo Savonarola
Cultural depictions of Caterina Sforza
Films about popes
Showtime (TV network) original programming
TNT (American TV network) original programming
Television series by Amblin Entertainment
Television series by CBS Studios
Television series by Bell Media
Television shows filmed in Hungary
Television shows set in Italy
Television shows set in Vatican City
2010s Hungarian television series
Television series set in the Renaissance
Television series set in the 15th century
Television series set in the 16th century